Reall Creek flows into the Mohawk River in Utica, New York.

References

Rivers of Oneida County, New York
Mohawk River
Rivers of New York (state)